Keep On Loving You may refer to:

"Keep On Loving You" (song), a song by REO Speedwagon from the album Hi Infidelity
"Keep On Lovin' You", a song by Steel Magnolia from the album Steel Magnolia
Keep On Loving You (album), a 2009 album by Reba McEntire
"I Keep On Loving You", a single from this album